The Macdonald–Laurier Institute (MLI) is a conservative, libertarian think tank located in Ottawa, Ontario, Canada, affiliated with the global Atlas Network. Its Managing Director is Brian Lee Crowley, who founded the Atlantic Institute for Market Studies. 

Founded in 2010, the institute is named after John A. Macdonald, Canada's first prime minister, and Wilfrid Laurier, the country's first French-Canadian prime minister. MLI is a registered charity with the Canada Revenue Agency. The institute has a board of directors and an internal advisory board that select themes and submit its research for external review.  The institute is funded by corporate and individual donors, as well as from private foundation funding.

Its political stance has been described as market-oriented. In August 2022, Russia designated the MLI as an "undesirable organisation".

Publishing
Since its foundation in March 2010, MLI has produced papers offering its perspective on crime statistics, Indigenous post-secondary education, inter-provincial trade, and prison radicalisation. In addition, study series have been initiated in the areas of Canada's founding ideas and the creation of a national security strategy for Canada such as the series on Aboriginal Canada and the Natural Resource Economy Series. The institute also published a policy paper reviewing mortgage insurance in Canada. (See list of publications below.)

MLI also published its first book in May 2010. Titled The Canadian Century: Moving out of America’s Shadow, the book appeared on the best-seller lists of the Montreal Gazette.

Disinfowatch

In September 2020, MLI launced "DisinfoWatch," a project to monitor and track disinformation in Canada and debunk misinformation, with a specific focus on the coronavirus pandemic. The project is funded by the Macdonald-Laurier Institute, the United States Department of State’s Global Engagement Center, and Journalists for Human Rights.

Impact
MLI contributors and staff have appeared in national and regional news media comment on a variety of national issues. The institute maintains a list of media information on its web site. The institute's Op-Eds have appeared in Canadian national newspapers such as The Globe and Mail and National Post, as well as in the Vancouver Sun, Calgary Herald, Windsor Star, Moncton Times & Transcript, Halifax Chronicle-Herald. The institute has also been highlighted in Foreign Policy magazine, The Wall Street Journal and The Economist.

A multi-year MLI campaign defended oil and gas development rights on Indigenous land, according to a report in the Guardian. For several years it helped discourage Canada's government from implementing a United Nations declaration on Indigenous peoples' rights to reject pipelines or drilling, until Parliament eventually passed a law in 2021. The Guardian said the MLI campaign was in partnership with the Atlas Network, a libertarian-conservative group based in the United States, but MLI disputed the relationship.

Political stance
Alejandro Chafuen, former president of the Atlas Network and current president of the Acton Institute, praised MLI in a 2012 Forbes article describing the market-oriented think tank landscape in Canada. The social democratic Broadbent Institute referred to the MacDonald-Laurier Institute as a "right-wing charity" in a 2018 article and MLI was described as similarly minded to the Fraser Institute in a 2012 article by the right-leaning National Post. The Fraser Institute, like the Macdonald-Laurier Institute, are both part of the Atlas Network.

Organisation
Source:

Board of directors
Pierre Casgrain, Chair
Laura Jones, Vice-Chair
Brian Lee Crowley, Managing Director
Vaughn MacLellan, Secretary
Martin MacKinnon, Treasurer
Blaine Favel, Director
Jayson Myers, Director
Dan Nowlan, Director
Vijay Sappani, Director
Veso Sobot, Director

Advisory Council 2019 
John Beck, executive chairman of Aecon
Erin Chutter, executive chair of Global Energy Metals Corporation
Navjeet (Bob) Dhillon, President and CEO of Mainstreet Equity Corp.
Jim Dinning, former Alberta Treasurer
David Emerson, former Canadian Minister of Foreign Affairs
Richard Fadden, Former National Security Advisor to the Prime Minister of Canada
Robert Fulford OC, Former editor of Saturday Night magazine, columnist with the National Post
Brian Flemming, Lawyer
J. Wayne Gudbranson, CEO of Branham Group Inc.
Calvin Helin Aboriginal author and entrepreneur, Vancouver
Peter John Nicholson, former President of the Council of Canadian Academies
Jim Peterson, former Canadian Minister of International Trade & Partner at Fasken Martineau, Toronto
Jacquelyn Thayer Scott, past President and Professor, Cape Breton University
Barry Sookman, Senior Partner, McCarthy Tétrault
Rob Wildeboer, executive chairman and co-founder of Martinrea International Inc

Research advisory board
Janet Ajzenstat
Brian Ferguson
Jack Granatstein
Patrick James
Rainer Knopff
Larry Martin
Christopher Sands
Elliot Tepper
William Watson

Books and publications

Books
The Canadian Century: Moving Out of America's Shadow, by Brian Lee Crowley, Jason Clemens and Neils Veldhuis, May 2010.
Fearful Symmetry: The Fall and Rise of Canada’s Founding Values, by Brian Lee Crowley.
The Economic Dependency Trap: Breaking Free To Self-Reliance, by MLI Advisory Council member Calvin Helin.

Study papers
The Way Out: New thinking about Aboriginal engagement and energy infrastructure to the West Coast Brian Lee Crowley and Ken Coates, 30 May 2013
Why Canadian crime statistics don't add up: Not the whole truth, by Scott Newark, February 9, 2011.
From Rehabilitation to Recruitment, by Alex Wilner, October 18, 2010.
Citizen of One, Citizen of the Whole: How Ottawa can strengthen our nation by eliminating provincial trade barriers with a charter of economic rights, by Brian Lee Crowley, Robert Knox and John Robson, June 21, 2010.
Free to Learn: Giving Aboriginal Youth Control over Their Post-Secondary Education, by Calvin Helin and Dave Snow, March 15, 2010.

National security strategy
To Stand On Guard, by Paul H. Chapin, November 29, 2010.

Pharmaceutical series
Pills, Patents & Profits, by Brian Ferguson, March 25, 2011.

Canada's founding ideas
Confederation and Individual Liberty, by Janet Ajzenstat, November 10, 2010.

Policy briefings
Mortgage Insurance in Canada, by Jane Londerville, November 18, 2010.

References

External links 
 The Macdonald–Laurier Institute
 

Think tanks based in Canada
2010 establishments in Canada
Undesirable organizations in Russia
Libertarian think tanks